The Urzhar is a river in the Abai Region, Kazakhstan.

The river flows across Urzhar village, the administrative center of Urzhar District. It is one of the three most important rivers flowing into Alakol lake. Its waters are used to irrigate crops and pasture areas.

Course
The Urzhar originates in the southern slopes of the western part of the Tarbagatai Range. It heads roughly southwards all along its course. In its upper section it flows as a typical mountain river within a narrow and deep valley with frequent rapids. After leaving the mountain area it enters the wide Balkhash-Alakol Basin and passes through the village of Urzhar. The speed of its current slows down, its channel widens and forms meanders. Further downstream it  divides into arms. Finally it reaches the northern lakeshore of lake Alakol near Kamyskala, former Ribachy village.

The river is fed partly by snow and partly by groundwater. Its main tributaries are rivers Bazarka, Kusak and Karagaila on the left, and Eginsu on the right.

See also
List of rivers of Kazakhstan

References

External links
Степной реки широкое раздолье

Rivers of Kazakhstan
Balkhash-Alakol Basin
Abai Region
ru:Урджар (река)